Theodore Meir Bikel (May 2, 1924 – July 21, 2015) was an American actor, folk singer, musician, composer, unionist, and political activist. He appeared in films, including The African Queen (1951), Moulin Rouge (1952), The Kidnappers (1953), The Enemy Below (1957), I Want to Live! (1958), My Fair Lady (1964), The Russians Are Coming, the Russians Are Coming (1966), and 200 Motels (1971). For his portrayal of Sheriff Max Muller in The Defiant Ones (1958), he was nominated for the Academy Award for Best Supporting Actor.

He made his stage debut in Tevye the Milkman in Tel Aviv, Israel, when he was in his teens. He later studied acting at Britain's Royal Academy of Dramatic Art, and made his London stage debut in 1948 and in New York in 1955. He was also a widely recognized and recorded folk singer and guitarist. In 1959, he co-founded the Newport Folk Festival, and created the role of Captain von Trapp opposite Mary Martin as Maria in the original Broadway production of Rodgers & Hammerstein's The Sound of Music. In 1969, Bikel began acting and singing on stage as Tevye in the musical Fiddler on the Roof, a role he performed more often than any other actor to date. The production won nine Tony Awards, and was one of the longest-running musicals in Broadway history.

Bikel was president of the Associated Actors and Artistes of America until 2014, and was president of Actors' Equity in the late 1970s and early 1980s. He served as the chairman of the board of directors of Partners for Progressive Israel, where he also lectured.

Early years
Theodore Bikel was born into a Jewish family in Vienna, Austria, the son of Miriam (née Riegler) and Josef Bikel, from Bukovina. As an active Zionist, his father named him after Theodor Herzl, the founder of modern Zionism. Following the German annexation of Austria in 1938, Bikel's family fled to Mandatory Palestine, where his father's contacts helped the family obtain British passports. Bikel studied at the Mikve Yisrael agricultural school and joined Kibbutz Kfar HaMaccabi.

Bikel started acting while in his teens. He performed with Habimah Theatre in 1943, and was one of the founding members of the Cameri Theatre, which became a leading Israeli theatre company. He described his acting experience there as similar to, if not better than, the method acting techniques taught at the Actors Studio in New York. "The Habimah people were much closer to the Method, indeed, than Lee Strasberg was, because they were direct disciples of Stanislavski."

In 1945, he moved to London to study at the Royal Academy of Dramatic Art. Finding work almost immediately, from the mid 40s to the late 50s, Bikel appeared in a slew of British B-movies, and the occasional 'A' film too, usually playing heavies and  crooks of various European  nationalities despite having perfected his English accent. He played the lead role in 1956 English film drama, 'Flight from Vienna'. Despite his success in the UK, the ever-ambitious Bikel travelled to the States in 1954 to pursue his career in the more lucrative Hollywood movie industry and on Broadway, becoming a naturalized citizen in 1961.

Bikel did not return to live in Israel, nor did he take part in the 1948 Arab–Israeli War. Bikel wrote in his autobiography, Theo: "A few of my contemporaries regarded [not returning to Israel] as a character flaw, if not a downright act of desertion. In me there remains a small, still voice that asks whether I can ever fully acquit myself in my own mind."

Career

Actor

In 1948, Michael Redgrave recommended Bikel to his friend Laurence Olivier as understudy for the parts of both Stanley Kowalski and Harold "Mitch" Mitchell in the West End premiere of Tennessee Williams' A Streetcar Named Desire. Aside from being an understudy, Bikel's main role in the production was the relatively minor part of Pablo Gonzales. He graduated from supporting actor and understudy, though, to star opposite the director's wife, Vivien Leigh, with a sudden, unplanned performance when a co-star, playing the role of Mitch, came down with a case of flu. Bikel showed up backstage and went directly to Leigh's dressing room to ask if she wanted to rehearse with him, to make sure he was right for the role. She replied that she did not need to: "Go and do it," she said. "You are a professional, and Larry gave you this job because he trusted you to do it well." After the show, Leigh told him, "Well done."

For most of his acting career, he was known for his versatility in playing characters of different nationalities; he claimed he took on those different personalities so his acting would "never get stale." On television, he played an Armenian merchant on Ironside, a Polish professor on Charlie's Angels, an American professor on The Paper Chase, a Bulgarian villain on Falcon Crest, a Belarusian on Star Trek: The Next Generation, and an Italian on Murder, She Wrote.

In movies, he played a German officer in The African Queen (1951) and The Enemy Below (1957), a Southern sheriff in The Defiant Ones, and a Russian submarine captain in the comedy The Russians Are Coming, the Russians Are Coming (1966). He also portrayed the sadistic General Jouvet in The Pride and the Passion (1957), and was screen tested for the role of Auric Goldfinger in the James Bond film Goldfinger (1964), though the part ultimately fell to German actor Gert Fröbe. In My Fair Lady (1964), he played the overbearing Hungarian linguist Zoltan Karpathy.

He made his Broadway debut in 1955 in Tonight in Samarkand, and in 1958 was nominated for a Tony for The Rope Dancers. In 1959, he created the role of Captain von Trapp in the original production of The Sound of Music, which earned him a second Tony nomination. Bikel did not like his role because his ability to sing was underused; neither did he like performing the same role of the captain repeatedly. When the composers, Rodgers and Hammerstein, realized Bikel was an accomplished folksinger, they wrote the song "Edelweiss" specifically for him to sing and accompany himself on the guitar.

In 1964, he played Zoltan Karpathy, the dialect expert, in the film version of My Fair Lady. Since his first appearance as Tevye in the musical Fiddler on the Roof (1967), Bikel had performed the role more often than any other actor (more than 2,000 times). When an injury required 74-year-old fellow Israeli performer Chaim Topol (veteran of many productions of the stage show and star of the motion picture Fiddler on the Roof) to withdraw from a high-budget, much-promoted 2009 North American tour of the musical, Bikel substituted for him in several appearances in 2010.

Bikel was a guest star on many popular television series. He appeared in an episode of the 1954 NBC legal drama Justice based on cases from the Legal Aid Society of New York. He also appeared in the episode entitled "The Faithful Pilgrimage" of CBS's Appointment with Adventure anthology series. The particular episode was written by Rod Serling. He also appeared in a second episode of Appointment with Adventure entitled "Return of the Stranger". Bikel also appeared in an acting role in Frank Zappa's experimental film 200 Motels (1971).

Bikel later guest-starred on Rod Serling's The Twilight Zone (episode "Four O'Clock" as Oliver Crangle). He appeared on episodes of Wagon Train, Combat! in the season-three episode "Mountain Man" as Francois Perrault, Hawaii Five-O, Columbo (1977, "The Bye-Bye Sky High I.Q. Murder Case"), Charlie's Angels, The San Pedro Beach Bums, Cannon, Little House on the Prairie, Mission: Impossible, Gunsmoke, Dynasty, All in the Family, Knight Rider, Murder, She Wrote, Fantasy Island, Law & Order, and Mickey Spillane's Mike Hammer (episode "Elegy for a Tramp" as Gerringer that aired on January 28, 1987).

In the early 1990s, he appeared on Star Trek: The Next Generation, in the episode "Family", playing Sergey Rozhenko, Worf's  Belarusian-born adoptive father. Bikel performed two roles in the Babylon 5 universe, in 1994 as Rabbi Koslov in the first-season episode "TKO" and in 1998, as Ranger leader Lenonn in the TV movie Babylon 5: In the Beginning.

Bikel was nominated for the Drama Desk Award in 2010 for outstanding solo performance for Sholom Aleichem: Laughter Through Tears, an off-Broadway play that he also wrote. In 2012, Bikel played the title role in Visiting Mr. Green with the Harold Green Jewish Theatre Company in Toronto, Ontario. In 2013, Bikel starred in Journey 4 Artists, a documentary that celebrates the power of music and religious diversity.

Folk singer and composer
In 1955, at the suggestion of Jac Holzman of Elektra Records, Bikel began recording songs, including several albums of Jewish folk songs and songs from Russia and other countries, making over 20 contemporary and folk music albums during his career. For those, he played acoustic guitar alone or accompanied by other musicians. He was able to sing in 21 different languages, including Yiddish, Hebrew, German, Russian, Hungarian, Romanian, French, medieval Spanish, Zulu, and English. His early albums included Israeli Folk Songs (1955) and Songs of Russian Old & New (1960).  Bikel's live performances were issued on two albums: Bravo Bikel (1959), and Bikel on Tour (1963).

In 1959, Bikel co-founded the Newport Folk Festival (together with Pete Seeger, Harold Leventhal, Oscar Brand, and George Wein). He performed a number of recorded duets with Judy Collins at various festivals and on television. During an interview, when asked what inspired him to become involved in organizing a folk festival, he said that music was "one of the few answers to the chaos that we have," one of the only recourses to avoid social strife, and a means of giving youth hope for a better world.

Bikel viewed then 21-year-old Bob Dylan as one of those young performers expressing emotional and social messages through song. In 1963, Bikel joined Dylan, Seeger, Peter, Paul and Mary, and Joan Baez for the festival grand finale as they sang "Blowin' in the Wind" and "We Shall Overcome". Following the festival, Bikel, Seeger, and Dylan traveled to a planned rally in Greenwood, Mississippi, to perform Dylan's newly written song, "Only a Pawn in Their Game", about the man who murdered Medgar Evers. Originally, only Bikel and Seeger were scheduled to perform, but Bikel wanted Dylan to go with them. He told Dylan's manager, Albert Grossman, "I'll tell you what. Buy him a ticket. Don't tell him where it came from. Tell him it's time to go down and experience the South."

Bikel's close friendship with Seeger was sometimes tested as a result of the Newport festival's choice of performers. On one occasion, Seeger became infuriated during Bob Dylan's legendary 1965 performance accompanied by the Paul Butterfield Blues Band. Seeger expected Bikel to support him: "Theo, for Chrissake—tell them. Set them straight!" Bikel stepped forward and told Seeger, "Peter, this band, these rebels—they are us. They are what we were 20 years ago. Remember?" Seeger stared at him "like a trauma victim", as Bikel succeeded in calming Seeger down enough to let the group finish their songs. In 1965, Bikel, as well as Seeger, was shocked when Bob Dylan turned electric at the festival, an event some call "Dylan's declaration of musical independence."

In 1962, Bikel became the first singer besides Dylan to perform "Blowin' in the Wind" in public. His album A Folksinger's Choice (1964) featured Jim McGuinn (as he was then known) on banjo. Bikel (with business partner Herb Cohen) opened the first folk music coffee house in Los Angeles, The Unicorn. Its popularity led to the two opening a second club, Cosmo Alley, which, in addition to folk music, presented poets such as Maya Angelou and comics including Lenny Bruce. Bikel became increasingly involved with civil-rights issues and progressive causes, and was a Eugene McCarthy delegate to the 1968 Democratic Convention.

Personal life

Bikel was married four times. He married Ofra Ichilov in 1942. They divorced the following year. His second marriage was in 1967 to Rita Weinberg Call, with whom he had two children. They divorced in 2008. He married conductor Tamara Brooks later that year. She died in 2012. He married journalist and foreign correspondent Aimee Ginsburg on December 29, 2013.

Political activism
Bikel was a longtime activist in the civil-rights and human-rights movements, participating as a fundraiser with performances. He co-founded the Actors Federal Credit Union in 1962, and in 1968, he was a delegate to the Democratic National Convention in Chicago. He was president of Actors' Equity from 1977 to 1982, in which office he supported human-rights causes. Since 1988, he had been president of the Associated Actors and Artistes of America.

Upon hearing of his death, Actors’ Equity wrote: "From the time he joined Equity in 1954, Bikel has been an advocate for the members of our union and his extraordinary achievements paved the way for so many. No one loved theater more, his union better, or cherished actors like Theo did. He has left an indelible mark on generations of members past and generations of members to come. We thank you, Theo, for all you have done."

Bikel was an active supporter and campaigner for John F. Kennedy. He did some of his campaigning during the run of The Sound of Music, which got him into trouble with the producers, who did not think it was becoming for an actor. He recalls, "I would go out sometimes between matinee and evening performances, go to a rally and speak from a flat-bed truck, and then come back to the theater." The producers stopped complaining, however, when after one show he was picked up backstage by a limousine carrying Eleanor Roosevelt, and he accompanied her to a Democratic rally as her special guest.

At the 1977 AFL–CIO Convention, Bikel welcomed Russian dissident Vladimir Bukovsky upon his release from the Soviet Union. He was arrested in front of the Soviet Embassy in Washington in 1986 while protesting the plight of Soviet Jews.

President Jimmy Carter appointed him to serve on the National Council for the Arts in 1977 for a six-year term. In 2007, he served as chair of the Board of Directors of Meretz USA (now Partners for Progressive Israel).

He was a member of the high-IQ collective Mensa International.

Death
Bikel died on July 21, 2015, at Ronald Reagan UCLA Medical Center in Los Angeles of natural causes, according to publicist Harlan Boll, survived by Ms. Ginsburg, his sons from his second marriage, Robert and Daniel, and three grandchildren. He was buried at Hillside Memorial Park Cemetery in Culver City, California.

Bibliography

Awards and recognition

1959 – Academy Award nomination for The Defiant Ones
1992 – Honorary Doctorate of the University of Hartford
1997 – Lifetime Achievement Award from the National Foundation for Jewish Culture
2005 – Star on the Hollywood Walk of Fame (6233 Hollywood Blvd.)
2008 – Golden Rathausmann of Vienna (November 27)
2009 – Austrian Cross of Honour for Science and Art, 1st class (November 15)
2014 – Lifetime Achievement Award from Rhode Island International Film Festival (August)

Discography

Folk Songs of Israel (1955), Elektra
An Actor’s Holiday (1956), Elektra
A Young Man and a Maid (with Cynthia Gooding) (1957), Elektra
Theodore Bikel Sings Jewish Folk Songs (1958), Elektra
To Broadway, To Life!: The Musical Theater of Bock and Harnick
Folk Songs from Just about Everywhere (with Geula Gill) (1959), Elektra
More Jewish Folk Songs (1959), Elektra
Bravo Bikel (Town Hall Concert) (1959), Elektra
Songs of Russia Old and New (1960), Elektra
Newport Folk Festival 1960 (5 songs), Elektra
The Sound of Music (Original Broadway Cast) (1960), Columbia Records
From Bondage to Freedom (1961), Elektra
A Harvest of Israeli Folk Songs (1961), Elektra
The Poetry and Prophecy of The Old Testament (1962), Elektra
The Best of Bikel (1962), Elektra
Theodore Bikel on Tour (1963), Elektra
A Folksinger’s Choice (1964), Elektra
The King and I (1964), Columbia Records
Yiddish Theatre and Folk Songs (1965), Elektra

Songs of the Earth (with The Pennywhistlers) (1967), Elektra
Theodore Bikel Is Tevye (1968), Elektra
A New Day (1970), Reprise Records
Silent No More (Soviet Jewish Underground) (1972), Star Records
Theodore Bikel for the Young (1973), Peter Pan Records
Theodore Bikel Sings Jewish Holiday Songs (1987)
A Passover Story (1991), Western Wind
A Chanukkah Story (1992), Western Wind
Theodore Bikel Sings Jewish Folk Songs (CD reissue, 1992), Bainbridge Records
Theodore Bikel Sings More Jewish Folk Songs (CD reissue, 1992) Bainbridge Records
Rise up and Fight–Songs of Jewish Partisans (1996), Holocaust Museum
Tevye the Dairyman and the Railroad Stories (1996) Macmillan audio
A Taste of Passover (1998), Rounder Records
Classic Jewish Holiday & Shabbat Songs (2000), Sameach Records
A Taste of Chanukkah (2000), Rounder Records
Theodore Bikel's Treasury of Yiddish Folk & Theatre Songs (2004), Rhino Handmade
In My Own Lifetime  (2006), Jewish Music Group
Our Song (with Alberto Mizrahi) (2007), Opus Magica Musica

Filmography

Film

Television

See also 

 List of German-speaking Academy Award winners and nominees
 Long-running musical theatre productions

Notes

References

External links

 
 
 
 
 
 
 
 
 Part 1 of 2 of interview by Jerry Williams on WMEX Radio in Boston hours after the Kennedy Assassination
 Part 2 of 2 of interview by Jerry Williams on WMEX Radio in Boston hours after the Kennedy Assassination
 Interview with Theodore Bikel – Ames Tribune, 24 10 January 2015.
 

1924 births
2015 deaths
20th-century American male actors
21st-century American male actors
Alumni of RADA
American male film actors
American male musical theatre actors
American male television actors
American memoirists
American political activists
Austrian emigrants to Israel
Burials at Hillside Memorial Park Cemetery
Elektra Records artists
Israeli Ashkenazi Jews
Israeli emigrants to the United States
Jewish American male actors
Jewish American musicians
Jewish emigrants from Austria to the United States after the Anschluss
Jewish folk singers
American trade union leaders
Male actors from Vienna
Mensans
Meretz politicians
Musicians from Vienna
Recipients of the Austrian Cross of Honour for Science and Art, 1st class
Yiddish-language singers
21st-century American Jews
Presidents of the Actors' Equity Association
Yiddish-language singers of the United States